ThinkPad  is a line of business-oriented laptop computers and tablets designed, developed and marketed by Lenovo, and formerly by IBM until 2005, when IBM's PC business was acquired by Lenovo. ThinkPads have a distinct black, boxy design language, inspired by a Japanese bento lunchbox, which originated in 1990 and is still used in some models. Most models also feature a red-colored trackpoint on the keyboard, which has become an iconic and distinctive design characteristic associated with the ThinkPad line.

The ThinkPad line was first developed at the IBM Yamato Facility in Japan, and the first ThinkPads were released in October 1992. It has seen significant success in the business market. ThinkPad laptops have been used in outer space and for many years were the only laptops certified for use on the International Space Station. ThinkPads have also for several years been one of the preferred laptops used by the United Nations.

History 
The ThinkPad was developed to compete with Toshiba and Compaq, who had created the first two portable notebooks, with an emphasis on sales to the Harvard Business School.

The name "ThinkPad" was a product of IBM's corporate history and culture. Thomas J. Watson Sr. first introduced "Think" as an IBM slogan in the 1920s. With every minicomputer and mainframe, IBM installed (almost all were leased – not sold), a blue plastic sign was placed atop the operator's console, with the text "Think" printed on an aluminum plate.

For decades IBM had also distributed small notepads with the word "THINK" emblazoned on a brown leatherette cover to customers and employees. The name "ThinkPad" was suggested by IBM employee Denny Wainwright, who had one such notepad in his pocket. The name was opposed by the IBM corporate naming committee as all the names for IBM computers were numeric at that time, but "ThinkPad" was kept due to praise from journalists and the public.

Early models
In April 1992, IBM announced the first ThinkPad model, the 700, later renamed the 700T after the release of three newer models, the 300, (new) 700 and 700C in October 1992. The 700T was a tablet computer.

This machine was the first product produced under IBM's new "differentiated product personality" strategy, a collaboration between Richard Sapper and Tom Hardy, head of the corporate IBM Design Program. Development of the 700C also involved a close working relationship between Sapper and Kazuhiko Yamazaki, lead notebook designer at IBM's Yamato Design Center in Japan and liaison between Sapper and Yamato engineering.

This 1990–1992 "pre-Internet" collaboration between Italy and Japan was facilitated by a special Sony digital communications system that transmitted high-res images over telephone lines. This system was established in several key global Design Centers by Hardy so IBM designers could visually communicate more effectively and interact directly with Sapper for advice on their projects. For his innovative design management leadership during ThinkPad development, Hardy was named "innovator of the Year 1992" by PC Magazine.

The first ThinkPad tablet, a PenPoint-based device formally known as the IBM 2521 ThinkPad, was positioned as a developer's release. The ThinkPad tablet became available for purchase by the general public, as the 700T, in October of the same year.

IBM marketed the ThinkPad creatively, through methods such as early customer pilot programs, numerous pre-launch announcements, and an extensive loaner program designed to showcase the product's strengths and weaknesses, including loaning a machine to archaeologists excavating the ancient Egyptian city of Leontopolis. The resulting report documented the ThinkPad's excellent performance under difficult conditions; "The ThinkPad is an impressive machine, rugged enough to be used without special care in the worst conditions Egypt has to offer."

The first ThinkPads were very successful, collecting more than 300+ awards for design and quality.

Acquisition by Lenovo

In 2005, Lenovo purchased the IBM personal computer business and the ThinkPad as a flagship brand along with it. Speaking about the purchase of IBM's personal computer division, Lenovo founder Liu Chuanzhi said, "We benefited in three ways from the IBM acquisition. We got the ThinkPad brand, IBM's more advanced PC manufacturing technology and the company's international resources, such as its global sales channels and operation teams. These three elements have shored up our sales revenue in the past several years."

Although Lenovo acquired the right to use the IBM brand name for five years after its acquisition of IBM's personal computer business, Lenovo only used it for three years. Today Lenovo manufactures and markets Think-branded products while IBM is mostly responsible for overseeing servicing and repairs for the Think line of products produced by Lenovo. Both IBM and Lenovo play a key role in the design of their "Think" branded products.

Most of the Think line of products are designed at the Yamato Labs in Japan.

Manufacturing
The majority of ThinkPad computers since the 2005 acquisition of the brand by Lenovo have been made in Mexico, Slovakia, India and China. Lenovo also employs ~300 people at a combined manufacturing and distribution centre near its American headquarters. Each device made in this facility is labelled with a red-white-and-blue sticker proclaiming "Whitsett, North Carolina." 

In 2012, Lenovo produced a short run of special edition anniversary ThinkPads in Yonezawa, Yamagata, Japan, in partnership with NEC, as part of a larger goal to move to manufacture away from China and into Japan.

In 2014, although sales rose 5.6 percent from the previous year, Lenovo lost its position as the top commercial notebook maker. However, the company celebrated a milestone in 2015 with the shipment of the 100 millionth unit of its ThinkPad line.

Design 

The design language of the ThinkPad has remained very similar throughout the entire lifetime of the brand. Almost all models are solid black inside and out, with a boxy, right-angled external case design. Some newer Lenovo models incorporate more curved surfaces in their design. Many ThinkPads have incorporated magnesium, carbon fiber reinforced plastic or titanium into their chassis.

The industrial design concept was created in 1990 by Italy-based designer Richard Sapper, a corporate design consultant of IBM and, since 2005, Lenovo. The design was based on the concept of a traditional Japanese bento lunchbox, which revealed its nature only after being opened. According to later interviews with Sapper, he also characterized the simple ThinkPad form to be as elementary as a simple, black cigar box and with similar proportions, with the same observation that it offers a 'surprise' when opened.

Since 1992, the ThinkPad design has been regularly updated, developed and refined over the years by Sapper and the respective teams at IBM and later Lenovo. On the occasion of the 20th anniversary of ThinkPad's introduction, David Hill authored and designed a commemorative book about ThinkPad design titled ThinkPad Design: Spirit & Essence.

Features and technologies 
Several unique features have appeared in the ThinkPad line, like drive protection, a pointing stick or TPM chips.

While few features remain unique to the series, several laptop technologies originated on ThinkPads:

Current
 Lenovo Vantage

Earlier known as "IBM Access", later "ThinkVantage", the Lenovo Vantage is a suite of computer management applications. This software can give additional support for system management (backup, encrypting, system drivers installation and upgrade, system monitoring and others). Currently, some old features have been replaced by internal Windows 10 features.

TPM chips
IBM was the first company that supported a TPM module. Modern ThinkPads still have this feature.

ThinkShutter
ThinkShutter is the branding of a webcam privacy shutter present in some ThinkPad notebook computers. It is a simple mechanical sliding cover that allows the user to obstruct the webcam's view.  Some add-on webcams and other laptop brands provide a similar feature. IdeaPad notebooks carry the TrueBlock branding for their privacy shutters.

Spill-resistant keyboards
Some ThinkPad models have a keyboard membrane and drain holes (P series, classic T series and T###p models), and some have a solid rubber or plastic membrane (like X1 series and current T and X series), without draining holes.

UltraNav
The first ThinkPad 700 was equipped with the signature TrackPoint red dot pointing stick invented by Ted Selker. By 2000 the trackpad pointer had become more popular for laptops due to innovations by Synaptics so IBM introduced UltraNav as a complementary combination of TrackPoint and TouchPad designed by Dave Sawin, Hiroaki Yasuda, Fusanobo Nakamura, and Mitsuo Horiuchi to please all users.

A roll cage frame and stainless steel hinges with 180° or 360° opening angle
The "roll cage" is an internal frame, designed to minimize motherboard flex (current P series and T##p series) or magnesium composite case (all other hi-end models). The display modules lack magnesium frames, and some 2012-2016 models have a common issue with a cracked plastic lid. The 180° hinges are typical, the 360° hinges are a Yoga line basic feature.

OLED screens
Introduced in 2016 as a hi-end display option for some models.

The Active Protection System 
Hard-drive protection for some ThinkPad models that still use the 2.5" drive bay; These systems use an accelerometer sensor to detect when a ThinkPad is falling and shut down the hard disk drive to prevent damage.

Biometric fingerprint reader and NFC Smart card reader options
The fingerprint reader was introduced as an option by IBM in 2004. ThinkPads were one of the first laptops to include this feature.

Internal WWAN modules and Wi-Fi 3x3 MIMO
The Mobile broadband support is a common feature for most the actual ThinkPad models after 2006; the support of 3x3 MIMO is a common feature for most of hi-end models.

Some additional features (dock stations, UltraBay, accessories support) were listed in Accessories section.

Past

ThinkLight
External keyboard light, replaced by internal backlight; is an LED light located at the top of the LCD screen which illuminates the keyboard from above.

ThinkBridge
Only T, W and X series ThinkPads feature (for some 2013-2018 models) — internal secondary battery (as succession of secondary UltraBay battery) that support a hot-swapping of primary battery.

7-row Keyboards
Original IBM keyboard design (1992-2012) — The original keyboard offered in the ThinkPad line until 2012, when it was swapped out for the chiclet style keyboard now used today.
IBM TrackWrite keyboard design — A unique keyboard designed by John Karidis introduced by IBM in 1995, used in the ThinkPad 701 series. When the machine is closed the keyboard is folded inwards, making the machine more compact. However when the machine is open and in use, it slides out, giving the user a normal sized keyboard. That keyboard, referred to as a butterfly keyboard, which is widely considered a design masterpiece and is in the permanent collection of the Museum of Modern Art in New York City.

The ThinkPad 760 series also included an unusual keyboard design; the keyboard was elevated by two arms riding on small rails on the side of the screen, tilting the keyboard to achieve a more ergonomic design.

The keyboard design was replaced by the Chiclet style keyboard (2012-current) — The keyboard adopted by Lenovo in 2012 over the original IBM keyboard design. And does not support the ThinkLight to illuminate the keyboard, instead using a keyboard backlight. (Some ThinkPad models during the intermission period between the classic IBM design and the Lenovo chiclet design could be outfitted with both the backlit chiclet style keyboard and the ThinkLight.)

FlexView AFFS or IPS screens
The introduced in 2004 line of hi-end displays with wide view angles and optional high resolution (up to 15" 1600x1200 or (rarely) 2048x1536 pixels). Partially dropped in 2008 (after partial defunct of BOE-Hydis display supplier), and reintroduced as ordinary IPS screen option in 2013.

Batteries
Some Lenovo laptops (such as the X230, W530 and T430) block third-party batteries. Lenovo calls this feature "Battery Safeguard". It was first introduced on some models in May 2012. Laptops with this feature scan for security chips that only ThinkPad-branded batteries contain. Affected ThinkPads flash a message stating "Genuine Lenovo Battery Not Attached" when third-party batteries are used, and the battery will not charge.

Operating systems
The ThinkPad has shipped with Microsoft Windows from its inception until present day. Alongside MS-DOS, Windows 3.1x was the default operating system on the original ThinkPad 700.

IBM and Microsoft's joint operating system, known as OS/2, although not as popular, was also made available as an option from the ThinkPad 700 in 1992, and was officially supported until the T43 in 2005.

The IBM ThinkPad Power Series line, sold from 1994 through 1998, was available with AIX and Solaris operating systems.

IBM took its first steps toward ThinkPads with an alternative operating system, when they quietly certified the 390 model for SUSE Linux in November 1998. The company released its first Linux-based unit with the ThinkPad A20m in July 2000. This model, along with the closely-released A21m, T21 and T22 models, came preinstalled with Caldera OpenLinux. IBM shifted away from preinstalled Linux on the ThinkPad after 2002, but continued to support other distributions such as Red Hat Linux, SUSE Linux Enterprise, and Turbolinux by means of customer installations on A30, A30p, A31p models. This continued through the Lenovo transition with the T60p, until September 2007.

The following year, ThinkPads began shipping with Linux again, when the R61 and T61 were released with SUSE Linux Enterprise as an option. This was shortlived, as Lenovo discontinued that practice in 2009. ThinkPad hardware continued to be certified for Linux.

In 2020, Lenovo shifted into much heavier support of Linux when they announced the ThinkPad X1 Carbon Gen 8, the P1 Gen 2, and the P53 would come with Fedora Linux as an option. This was the first time that Fedora Linux was made available as a preinstalled option from a major hardware vendor. Following that, Lenovo then began making Ubuntu available as a preinstalled option across nearly thirty different notebook and desktop models, and Fedora Linux on all of its P series lineup.

A small number of ThinkPads are preinstalled with Google's ChromeOS. On these devices, ChromeOS is the only officially supported operating system where installation of Windows and other operating systems requires putting the device into developer mode.

Use in space

ThinkPads have been used heavily in space programs. NASA purchased more than 500 ThinkPad 750 laptops for flight qualification, software development, and crew training, and astronaut (and senator) John Glenn used ThinkPad laptops on his spaceflight mission STS-95 in 1998.

ThinkPad models used on Shuttle missions include:
 ThinkPad 750 (first use in December 1993 supporting the Hubble repair mission)
 ThinkPad 750C
 ThinkPad 755C
 ThinkPad 760ED
 ThinkPad 760XD (ISS Portable Computing System)
 ThinkPad 770
 ThinkPad A31p (ISS Portable Computing System)
 ThinkPad T61p
 ThinkPad P52 
 ThinkPad T490 
 ThinkPad P15 

The ThinkPad 750 flew aboard the Space Shuttle Endeavour during a mission to repair the Hubble Space Telescope on 2 December 1993, running a NASA test program which checked if radiation in the space environment caused memory anomalies or other unexpected problems. ThinkPads were also used in conjunction with a joystick for the Portable In-Flight Landing Operations Trainer (PILOT).

ThinkPads have also been used on space stations. At least three ThinkPad 750C were left in the Spektr module of Mir when it depressurized, and the 755C and 760ED were used as part of the Shuttle–Mir Program, the 760ED without modifications. Additionally, for several decades ThinkPads were the only laptops certified for use on the International Space Station.

ThinkPads used aboard the space shuttle and International Space Station feature safety and operational improvements for the environment they must operate in. Modifications include Velcro tape to attach to surfaces, upgrades to the CPU and video card cooling fans to accommodate for microgravity (in which warmer air does not rise) and lower density of the cabin air, and an adapter for the station's 28 volt DC power.

Throughout 2006, a ThinkPad A31p was being used in the Service Module Central Post of the International Space Station and seven ThinkPad A31p laptops were in service in orbit aboard the International Space Station. As of 2010, the Space Station was equipped with ThinkPad A31 computers and 32 ThinkPad T61p laptops. All laptops aboard the ISS are connected to the station's LAN via Wi-Fi and are connected to the ground at 3 Mbit/s up and 10 Mbit/s down, comparable to home DSL connection speeds.

Since a new contract with HP in 2016 provided a small number of modified ZBook laptops for ISS use, ThinkPads are no longer the only laptops flown on the ISS but are the predominant laptop present there.

Popularity 
The brand has obtained a cult following amongst computer enthusiasts since its inception. There are large communities on the Internet dedicated to the line where people have discussions about it, share photos and videos of their own ThinkPads, etc. Older ThinkPad models remain popular among enthusiasts and collectors, who still see them as durable, highly usable machines, despite no longer being modern.

Aftermarket parts have been developed for some models, such as the X60 and X200, for which custom motherboards with more modern processors have been created.

In January 2015, Lenovo celebrated one hundred million ThinkPads being sold.

Reviews and awards
Laptop Magazine in 2006 called the ThinkPad the highest-quality laptop computer keyboard available. It was ranked first in reliability and support in PC Magazine's 2007 Survey.

The ThinkPad was the PC Magazine 2006 Reader's Choice for PC based laptops, and ranked number 1 in Support for PC based laptops. The ThinkPad Series was the first product to receive PC World's Hall of Fame award.

The Enderle Group's Rob Enderle said that the constant thing about ThinkPad is that the "brand stands for quality" and that "they build the best keyboard in the business."

The ThinkPad X Tablet-series was PC Magazine Editor's Choice for tablet PCs. The  ThinkPad X60s was ranked number one in ultraportable laptops by PC World. It lasted 8 hours and 21 minutes on a single charge with its 8-cell battery. The Lenovo ThinkPad X60s Series is on PC World's Top 100 Products of 2006. The 2005 PC World Reliability and Service survey ranked ThinkPad products ahead of all other brands for reliability.

In the 2004 survey, they were ranked second (behind eMachines). Lenovo was named the most environment-friendly company in the electronics industry by Greenpeace in 2007 but has since dropped to place 14 of 17 as of October 2010.

The IBM/Lenovo ThinkPad T60p received the Editor's Choice award for Mobile Graphic Workstation from PC Magazine. Lenovo ThinkPad X60 is the PC Magazine Editor's Choice among ultra-portable laptops. The Lenovo ThinkPad T400-Series was on PC World's Top 100 Products of 2009.

Current model lines

Legend: by starting weight

ThinkPad Yoga (2013–current)

The ThinkPad Yoga is an Ultrabook-class convertible device that functions as both a laptop and tablet computer. The Yoga gets its name from the consumer-oriented IdeaPad Yoga line of computers with the same form factor. The ThinkPad Yoga has a backlit keyboard that flattens when flipped into tablet mode. This was accomplished on 1st generation X1 Yoga with a platform surrounding the keys that rises until level with the keyboard buttons, a locking mechanism that prevents key presses, and feet that pop out to prevent the keyboard from directly resting on flat surfaces. On later X1 Yoga generations, the keys themselves retract in the chassis, so the computer rests on fixed small pads. Touchpad is disabled in this configuration. Lenovo implemented this design in response to complaints about its earlier Yoga 13 and 11 models being awkward to use in tablet mode. A reinforced hinge was required to implement this design. Other than its convertible form factor, the ThinkPad Yoga retains standard ThinkPad features such as a black magnesium-reinforced chassis, island keyboard, a red TrackPoint, and a large touchpad.

Tablets

ThinkPad Tablet

Released in August 2011, the ThinkPad Tablet is the first in Lenovo's line of business-oriented Tablets with the ThinkPad brand. The tablet has been described by Gadget Mix as a premium business tablet. Since the Tablet is primarily business-oriented, it includes features for security, such as anti-theft software, the ability to remotely disable the tablet, SD card encryption, layered data encryption, and Cisco Virtual Private Network (VPN).

Additionally, the ThinkPad Tablet is able to run software such as IBM's Lotus Notes Traveler. The stylus could be used to write notes on the Tablet, which also included software to convert this handwritten content to text. Another feature on the Tablet was a drag-and-drop utility designed to take advantage of the Tablet's touch capabilities. This feature could be used to transfer data between USB devices, internal storage, or an SD card.

Slashgear summarized the ThinkPad Tablet by saying, "The stylus and the styling add up to a distinctive slate that doesn't merely attempt to ape Apple's iPad."

ThinkPad Tablet 2

In order to celebrate the 20th anniversary of the ThinkPad, Lenovo held a large party in New York where it announced several products, including the Tablet 2. Lenovo says that the ThinkPad Tablet 2 will be available on 28 October 2012 when Windows 8 is released. The ThinkPad Tablet 2 runs the Windows 8 Professional operating system. It will be able to run any desktop software compatible with this version of Windows.

The Tablet 2 is based on the Clover Trail version of the Intel Atom processor that has been customized for tablets. The Tablet 2 has 2 gigabytes of RAM and a 64GB SSD. In a preview, CNET wrote, "Windows 8 looked readable and functional, both in Metro and standard Windows-based interfaces." A mini-HDMI port is included for video output. An 8-megapixel rear camera and a 2-megapixel front camera are included along with a noise-canceling microphone in order to facilitate video conferencing.

ThinkPad 8

Announced and released in January 2014, the ThinkPad 8 is based on Intel's Bay Trail Atom Z3770 processor, with 2 GB of RAM and up to 128 GB of built-in storage. ThinkPad 8 has an 8.3-inch IPS display with a 16:10 aspect ratio and a resolution of  pixels. Other features include an aluminum chassis, micro-HDMI port, 8-megapixel back camera (with flash), and optional 4G connectivity. It runs Windows 8 as an operating system.

ThinkPad 10

Announced in May 2014, Lenovo ThinkPad 10 is a successor to the ThinkPad Tablet 2 and was scheduled to launch in the summer of 2014 along with accessories such as a docking station and external detachable magnetic keyboards. It used Windows 8.1 Pro as its operating system. It was available in 64 and 128GB variants with 1.6GHz quad-core Intel Atom Baytrail processor and 2GB or 4GB of RAM. It optionally supported both 3G and 4G (LTE).  Display resolution was announced to be , paired with a stylus pen.

ThinkPad X1 Tablet
The ThinkPad X1 Tablet is a fanless tablet powered by Core M CPUs. It is available with 4, 8 or 16GB of LPDDR3 RAM and SATA or a PCIe NVMe SSDs with up to 1TB. It has a  IPS screen and supports touch and pen input.

ThinkPad 11e (2014–current)
The ThinkPad 11e is a "budget" laptop computer for schools and students with an 11-inch screen and without trackpoint. 11e Yoga is a convertible version of 11e.

E Series (2011–current)

The E Series is a low-cost ThinkPad line, designed for small business mass-market requirements, and currently contains only a 14" and 15" sub-lines. The E Series line of laptops replaced Lenovo's Edge Series, but somewhere (in some countries) currently (May 2019) offered as both of "Thinkpad Edge/E series" names. The E series also lack metals like magnesium and carbon fibre in their construction which other members of the ThinkPad family enjoy.

L Series (2010–current)

The L Series replaced the former R Series, and is positioned as a mid-range ThinkPad offering with mainstream Intel Core i3/i5/i7 CPUs. The L Series have 3 sub-lines, the long-running 14" and 15.6" (and as launched this line had two models, L412 and the L512 in 2010); and as of 2018 there is also a 13" L380 available, which replaces the ThinkPad 13.

T series (2000–current)

The T series historically had high-end features, such as magnesium alloy roll-cages, high-density IPS screens known as FlexView (discontinued after the T60 series), 7-row keyboards, screen latches, the Lenovo UltraBay, and ThinkLight. Models included both 14.1-inch and 15.4-inch displays available in 4:3 and 16:10 aspect ratios.

Since 2012, the entire ThinkPad line was given a complete overhaul, with modifications such as the removal of separate buttons for use with the TrackPoint (xx40 series – 2014, then reintroduced xx50 series – 2015), removal of separate audio control buttons, removal of screen latch, and the removal of LED indicator lights. Models starting from the xx40 series featured a Power Bridge battery system, which had a combination of a lower capacity built-in battery and a higher capacity external battery, enabling the user to switch the external without putting the computer into hibernation. However, beginning with the 2019 xx90 series models, the external battery was removed in favor of a single internal battery. Also, non-widescreen displays are no longer available, with 16:9 aspect ratio as the only remaining choice.

The Tx20 series ThinkPads came in two editions: 15" (T520) or a 14" (T420). These are the last ThinkPads to use the classic 7-row keyboard, with the exception of the Lenovo ThinkPad 25th anniversary edition released on Oct. 5, 2017, which was based on the ThinkPad T470.

Over time, The T series ThinkPad's purpose has changed. Initially, the T series ThinkPad was meant to have high-end business features and carry a 10–20% markup over the other ThinkPads. Starting with the T400, the ThinkPad T series became less of a high-end business laptop and became more suited as a mobile workstation, becoming similar to the W-series or P-series ThinkPads. Achieving similar performance to the W-series, but with a 5–10% smaller profile than the W-series ThinkPads. In 2013, the T440 introduced another major shift in The ThinkPad T series. The ThinkPad became more of an overall office machine than a mobile workstation. By today's standards, The ThinkPad T series is thicker than most of its competitors.

X Series (2000–current)

The X Series is the main high-end ultraportable ThinkPad line, offering a lightweight, highly portable laptop with moderate performance. The current sub-lines for the X series includes:
 13" X13 (mainstream);
 X13 Yoga (convertible sub-line),
 14" X1 Carbon (premium sub-line), 
 X1 Yoga (premium convertible sub-line), and
 15" X1 Extreme (premium sub-line).

The daughter line includes the X1 Tablet (not to be confused with the 2005-2013 X Series tablets).

The mainstream current "workhorse" models is a X13 and X13 Yoga, the 13" successors of the classic discontinued 12" line of Lenovo X Series ThinkPads.

The premium 14"/15" thin-and-light line were the 13.3" ThinkPad models (the X300/X301) with ultrabay CD-ROM and removable battery, but are now replaced by the modern premium X1-series ultrabook line, such as the X1 Carbon, X1 Yoga, and X1 Extreme sub-series.

 
Discontinued mainstream lines such as the 12" X200(s), X201(s), and X220 models could be ordered with all of the high-end ThinkPad features (like Trackpoint, ThinkLight, a 7-row keyboard, a docking port, hot-swappable HDD, solid magnesium case and optional slice battery). The discontinued 12.5" X220 and X230 still featured a roll cage, a ThinkLight, and an optional premium IPS display (the first IPS display on a non-tablet ThinkPad since the T60p), but the 7-row keyboard was offered only with the X220. However, it lacked the lid latch mechanism which was present on the previous X200 and X201 versions. The discontinued slim 12" line contained only X200s and X201s with low power CPUs and high resolution displays, and X230s with low power CPUs. The 12.5" X series ThinkPads (such as X240 and later) had a more simplified design, and last 12" X280 model had only the Trackpoint feature, partially magnesium case and simplified docking port.

The obsolete low-cost 11.6" (netbook line) X100e and X120e were are all plastic, lacking both the latch and the ThinkLight, and using a variant of the island keyboard (known as chiclet keyboard) found on the Edge series. The X100e was also offered in red in addition to blue, and white in some countries. Those were more like high-end netbooks, whereas the X200 series were more like full ultraportables, featuring Intel Core (previously Core 2 and Celeron) series CPUs rather than AMD netbook CPUs.

The X Series with "tablet" suffixes is an outdated variant of the 12" X Series models, with low voltage CPUs and a flip-screen tablet resistive touchscreen. These include the traditional ThinkPad features, and have been noted for using a higher quality AFFS-type screen with better viewing angles compared to the screens used on other ThinkPads.

P Series (2015–current)

The P Series line of laptops replaced Lenovo's W Series and reintroduced 17" screens to the ThinkPad line. The P Series (excluding models with 's' suffix) is designed for engineers, architects, animators, etc. and comes with a variety of "high-end" options. All P Series models come included with fingerprint readers. The ThinkPad P Series includes features such as dedicated magnesium roll cages, more indicator LED lights, and high-resolution displays.

Z series (2022) 
The Z series currently consists of two models: the 13-inch model, Z13, and the 16-inch model, Z16. The series is marketed towards business customers, as well as a generally younger audience. The Verge wrote: "Lenovo is trying to make ThinkPads cool to the kids. The company has launched the ThinkPad Z-series, a thin and light ThinkPad line with funky colors, eco-friendly packaging, and a distinctly modern look." The series features a new metal sleek, contemporary, thin design, which differs greatly from other recent, more traditional-looking ThinkPad models. The Z13 model was introduced in three new colors—black, silver, and black vegan leather with bronze accents—while the Z16 is only available in one of them, silver. The laptops are equipped with new AMD Ryzen Pro processors. Other notable features include 1080p webcams, OLED displays, new, redesigned touchpads, spill resistant keyboards, Dolby Atmos speaker systems, and Windows 11 with Windows Hello support.

Accessories

Lenovo also makes a range of accessories meant to complement and enhance the experience of using a ThinkPad device. These include:

ThinkPad Stack (2015–current) 

The ThinkPad Stack line of products includes accessories designed for portability and interoperability. This line includes external hard drives, a wireless router, a power bank, and a Bluetooth 4.0 speaker. Each Stack device includes rubber feet, magnets, and pogo-pin power connections that allow the use of a single cable. The combined weight of all the Stack devices is slightly less than two pounds. The Stack series was announced in January 2015 at the International CES. The Stack series of accessories was expanded at the 2016 International CES to include a 720p resolution projector with 150 lumens of brightness and a wireless charging station.

The Stack has a "blocky, black, and rectangular" look with the ThinkPad logo. It shares a common design language with ThinkPad laptop computers.

Dock Stations (1993–current) 

Current docking stations (or docks) add much of the functional abilities of a desktop computer, including multiple display outputs, additional USB ports, and occasionally other features. This allows the ThinkPads to be connected and disconnected from various peripherals quickly and easily.

Recent docks connect via a proprietary connector located on the underside of the laptops; or via USB-C.

UltraBay (1995–2014) 

The internal replaceable (hot-swappable) CD-drive bay that supports a list of optional components, such as a CD-/DVD/Blu-ray drives, hard drive caddies, additional batteries, or device cradles.

Slice batteries (2000-2012) 
Some classic models (IBM and early Lenovo T and X series) can support an additional slice battery instead of the UltraBay additional battery.

UltraPort (2000–2002)

ThinkPad USB 3.0 Secure Hard Drive
An external USB 3.0/2.0 hard drive that was designed by Lenovo in 2009. It requires the input of a 4 digit PIN to access data and this can be set by the user.
These drives are manufactured for lenovo by Apricorn, Inc.

ThinkPad keyboards (external)
IBM/Lenovo made several usb/Bluetooth keyboards with integrated UltraNav's and TrackPoints. Notable models include

 SK-8845
 SK-8835
 SK-8855
 ThinkPad Compact USB Keyboard (current model)
 ThinkPad Compact Bluetooth Keyboard (current model)
 ThinkPad TrackPoint Keyboard II (current model)

ThinkPad mice
ThinkPad mice come in several different varieties ranging from Bluetooth ones through wired ones, to even ones with a trackpoint built-in and labelled as a scroll point.

ThinkPad stands
Thinkplus laptop stands(asia markets only)

ThinkPlus charger
GaN charger with a USB-C output.
They are mostly sold with the "thinkplus" branding in Asia (notably south-east Asia) and are popular there.

Historical models

ThinkPad 235
The Japan-only ThinkPad 235 (or Type 2607) was the progeny of the IBM/Ricoh RIOS project. Also known as Clavius or Chandra2, it contains unusual features like the presence of three PCMCIA slots and the use of dual camcorder batteries as a source of power. Features an Intel Pentium MMX 233 MHz CPU, support for up to 160 MB of EDO memory, and a built-in  hard drive with UDMA support. Hitachi marketed Chandra2 as the Prius Note 210.

ThinkPad 240

The ultraportable ThinkPad 240 (X, Z) started with an Intel Celeron processor and went up to the 600 MHz Intel Pentium III. In models using the Intel 440BX chipset, the RAM was expandable to 320 MB max with a BIOS update. Models had a  screen and an  key pitch (a standard key pitch is ). They were also one of the first ThinkPad series to contain a built-in Mini PCI card slot (form factor 3b). The 240s have no optical disc drives and an external floppy drive. An optional extended battery sticks out the bottom like a bar and props up the back of the laptop.

300 Series
The 300-series (300, 310, 340, 345, 350, 360, 365, 370, 380, 385, 390 (all with various sub-series)) was a long-running value series starting at the 386SL/25 processor, all the way to the Pentium III 450. The 300 series was offered as a slightly lower-price alternative from the 700 series, with a few exceptions.

The ThinkPad 360P and 360PE was a low-end version of ThinkPad 750P, and was unique model in the 300 series in that it could be used as a regular laptop, or transform into a tablet by flipping the monitor on top of itself. Retailing for $3,699 in 1995, the 360PE featured a touch sensitive monitor that operated with the stylus; the machine could run operating systems that supported the touch screen such as PenDOS 2.2.

500 Series
The 500-series (500, 510, 560 (E, X, Z), 570 (E)) were the main line of the ultraportable ThinkPads. Starting with the 486SLC2-50 Blue Lightning to the Pentium III 500, these machines had only a hard disk on board. Any other drives were external (or in the 570's case in the UltraBase).

600 Series

The 600-series (600, 600E, and 600X) are the direct predecessors of the T series. IBM was able to create this light, fully featured machine by using lightweight but strong carbon fiber composite plastics. The battery shipped with some 600-series models had a manufacturing defect that left it vulnerable to memory effect and resulted in poor battery life, but this problem can be avoided by use of a third-party battery.

700 Series

The 700-series was a highend ThinkPad line; The released models (700T, 710T and 730T tablets; 700, 701, 720, 730, 750, 755, 760, 765, 770 laptops with various sub-models) can be configured with the best screens, largest hard drives and fastest processors available in the ThinkPad range; some features can be found only on a 700 series models, and was the first successful ThinkPad introduced in 1992 (that was a tablet PC 700T model without a keyboard and a mouse).

800 Series

The ThinkPad 800-series (800/820/821/822/823/850/851/860) were unique as they were based on the PowerPC architecture rather than the Intel x86 architecture. Most of the 800 Series laptops used the PowerPC 603e CPU, at speeds of 100 MHz, or 166 MHz in the 860 model. The PowerPC ThinkPad line was considerably more expensive than the standard x86 ThinkPads — even a modestly configured 850 cost upwards of $12,000. All of the PowerPC ThinkPads could run Windows NT 3.51 and 4.0, AIX 4.1.x, and Solaris Desktop 2.5.1 PowerPC Edition.

WorkPad
Based on ThinkPad design although branded WorkPad, the IBM WorkPad z50 was a Handheld PC running Windows CE, released in 1999. The WorkPad brand of products, outside of the z50 model, was a line of personal digital assistants.

i Series (1998–2002)

The ThinkPad i Series was introduced by IBM in 1999 and was geared towards a multimedia focus with many models featuring independent integrated CD players and multimedia access buttons. The 1400 and 1500 models were designed by Acer for IBM under contract (and are thus nicknamed the AcerPad) and featured similar hardware found in Acer laptops (including ALi chipsets, three way audio jacks and the internal plastics painted with a copper paint). Some of the i Series ThinkPads, particularly the Acer developed models, are prone to broken hinges and stress damage on the chassis.

One notable ThinkPad in the i Series lineup are the S3x (S30/S31) models: featuring a unique keyboard and lid design allowing a standard size keyboard to fit in a chassis that otherwise wouldn't be able to support the protruding keyboard. These models were largely only available in Asia Pacific. IBM offered an optional piano black lid on these models (designed by the Yamato Design lab). This is the only ThinkPad since the 701C to feature a special design to accommodate a keyboard that's physically larger than the laptop and also the only ThinkPad (aside from the Z61) to deviate away from the standard matte lid.

A Series (2000–2004)

The A-series was developed as an all-around productivity machine, equipped with hardware powerful enough to make it a desktop replacement. Hence it was the biggest and heaviest ThinkPad series of its time, but also had features not even found in a T-series of the same age. The A-series was dropped in favor of the G-series and R-series.

The A31 was released in 2002 as a desktop replacement system equipped with: A Pentium 4-M processor clocked at 1.6, 1.8, 1.9, or 2.0 GHz (max supported is a 2.6 GHz), An ATI Mobility Radeon 7500, 128 or 256 MB of PC2100 RAM (officially upgradable to 1 GB but can be unofficially upgraded to 2 GB), IBM High Rate Wireless (PRISM 2.5 Based, can be modified to support WPA-TKIP) and equipped with a 20, 30, or 40 GB hard disk drive.

R Series (2001–2010, 2018-2019)
The R Series was a budget line, beginning with the R30 in 2001 and ending with the R400 and R500 presented in 2008.

The successor of a R400 and R500 models is a ThinkPad L series L412 and L512 models.

A notable model is the R50p with an optional 15"  IPS LCD screen (introduced in 2003).

The R series reintroduced in 2018 (for Chinese market only) with the same hardware as E series models, but with aluminum display cover, discrete GPU, TPM chip and fingerprint reader.

G Series (2003–2006)
The G-series consisted of only three models, the G40, G41 and G50. Being large and heavy machines, equipped with powerful desktop processors, this line of ThinkPads consequently served mainly as replacements for desktop computers.

Z Series (2005–2007)
The Z series was released as a high-end multimedia laptop; as a result this was the first ThinkPad to feature a widescreen (16:10 aspect ratio) display. The Z-Series was also unique in that certain models featured an (optional) titanium lid. Integrated WWAN and a webcam were also found on some configurations. The series has only ever included the Z60 (Z60m and Z60t) and Z61 (Z61m, Z61t and Z61p); the latter of which is the first Z-Series ThinkPad with Intel "Yonah" Dual-Core Technology. The processor supports Intel VT-x; this is disabled in the BIOS but can be turned on with a BIOS update. Running fully virtualised operating systems via Xen or VMware is therefore possible. Despite the Z61 carrying the same number as the T61, the hardware of the Z61 is closer to a T60 (and likewise the Z60 being closer to a T43).

ThinkPad Reserve Edition (2007)
The "15-year anniversary" Thinkpad model (based on a X60s laptop).
This model was initially known inside of Lenovo as the "Scout".  This was the name of the horse ridden by Tonto, the sidekick from the 1950s television series The Lone Ranger. Lenovo envisioned the Scout as a very high-end ThinkPad that would be analogous to a luxury car. Each unit was covered in fine leather embossed with its owners initials. Extensive market research was conducted on how consumers would perceive this form factor. It was determined that they appreciated that it emphasised warmth, nature, and human relations over technology. The Scout was soon renamed the ThinkPad Reserve Edition. It came bundled with premium services including a dedicated 24-hour technical support hotline that would be answered immediately. It was released in 2007 and sold for $5,000 in the United States.

SL Series (2008–2010)

The SL Series was launched in 2008 as a low-end ThinkPad targeted mainly geared toward small businesses. These lacked several traditional ThinkPad features, such as the ThinkLight, magnesium alloy roll cage, UltraBay, and lid latch, and use a 6-row keyboard with a different layout than the traditional 7-row ThinkPad keyboard; also, SL-series models have IdeaPad-based firmware. Models offered included 13.3" (SL300), 14" (SL400 and SL410) and 15.6" (SL500 and SL510).

W Series (2008–2015)

The W-series laptops were introduced by Lenovo as workstation-class laptops with their own letter designation, a descendant of prior ThinkPad T series models suffixed with 'p' (e.g. T61p), and are geared towards CAD users, photographers, power users, and others, who need a high-performance system for demanding tasks. The W-series laptops were launched in 2008, at the same time as the Intel Centrino 2, marking an overhaul of Lenovo's product lineup. The first two W-series laptops introduced were the W500 and the W700.

Previously available were the W7xx series (17" widescreen model), the W500 (15.4" 16:10 ratio model), the W510 (15.6" 16:9 ratio model), and W520 (15.6" 16:9 ratio model).  The W700DS and the W701DS both had two displays: a 17" main LCD and a 10" slide-out secondary LCD.  The W7xx series were also available with a Wacom digitizer built into the palm rest. These high-performance workstation models offered more high-end components, such as quad core CPUs and higher-end workstation graphics compared to the T-series, and were the most powerful ThinkPad laptops available. Until the W540, they retained the ThinkLight, UltraBay, roll cage, and lid latch found on the T-series. The W540 release marked the end of the lid latch, ThinkLight, and hot-swappable UltraBays found in earlier models.

The ThinkPad W-series laptops from Lenovo are described by the manufacturer as being "mobile workstations", and suit that description by being physically on the larger side of the laptop spectrum, with screens ranging from 15" to 17" in size. Most W-series laptops offer high-end quad-core Intel processors with an integrated GPU as well as an Nvidia Quadro discrete GPU, utilizing Nvidia Optimus to switch between the two GPUs as required. Notable exceptions are the W500, which has ATI FireGL integrated workstation-class graphics, and the W550s, which is an Ultrabook-specification laptop with only a dual-core processor. The W-series laptops offer ISV certifications from various vendors such as Adobe Systems and Autodesk for CAD and 3D modeling software.

The ThinkPad W series has been discontinued and replaced by the P series mobile workstations.

Edge Series (2010)

The Edge Series was released early in 2010 as small business and consumer-end machines. The design was a radical departure compared to the traditional black boxy ThinkPad design, with glossy surfaces (optional matte finish on later models), rounded corners, and silver trim. They were also offered in red, a first for the traditionally black ThinkPads. Like the SL, this series was targeted towards small businesses and consumers, and lack the roll cage, UltraBay, lid latch, and ThinkLight of traditional ThinkPads (though the 2011 E220s and E420s had ThinkLights). This also introduced an island-style keyboard with a significantly different layout.

Models included 13.3" (Edge 13), 14" (Edge 14), and 15.6" (Edge 15) sizes. An 11.6" (Edge 11) model was offered, but not available in the United States. The latest models of E series can be offered with Edge branding, but this naming is optional and uncommon.

S Series (2012–2014)
The S Series is positioned as a mid-range ThinkPad offering, containing ultrabooks derived from the Edge Series.  As of August 2013, the S Series includes S531 and S440 models; their cases are made of aluminum and magnesium alloy, available in silver and gunmetal colors.

ThinkPad Twist (2012)
The Lenovo ThinkPad Twist (S230u) is a laptop/tablet computer hybrid aimed at high-end users. The Twist gets its name from its screen's ability to twist in a manner that converts the device into a tablet. The Twist has a 12.5" screen and makes use of Intel's Core i7 processor and SSD technology in lieu of a hard drive.

In a review for Engadget Dana Wollman wrote, "Lately, we feel like all of our reviews of Windows 8 convertibles end the same way. The ThinkPad Twist has plenty going for it: a bright IPS display, a good port selection, an affordable price and an unrivaled typing experience. Like ThinkPads past, it also offers some useful software features for businesses lacking dedicated IT departments. All good things, but what's a road warrior to do when the battery barely lasts four hours? Something tells us the Twist will still appeal to Lenovo loyalists, folks who trust ThinkPad's build quality and wouldn't be caught dead using any other keyboard. If you're more brand-agnostic, though, there are other Windows 8 convertibles with comfortable keyboards – not to mention, sharper screens, faster performance and longer battery life."

ThinkPad Helix (2013–2015)

The Helix is a convertible laptop satisfying both tablet and conventional notebook users. It uses a "rip and flip" design that allows the user to detach the display and then replace it facing in a different direction. It sports an 11.6" Full HD (1920 × 1080) display, with support for Windows 8 multi-touch. As all essential processing hardware is contained in the display assembly and it has multitouch capability, the detached monitor can be used as a standalone tablet computer. The Helix's high-end hardware and build quality, including Gorilla Glass, stylus-based input, and Intel vPro hardware-based security features, are designed to appeal to business users.

In a review published in Forbes Jason Evangelho wrote, "The first laptop I owned was a ThinkPad T20, and the next one may very likely be the ThinkPad Helix which Lenovo unveiled at CES 2013. In a sea of touch-inspired Windows 8 hardware, it's the first ultrabook convertible with a form factor that gets everything right. The first batch of Windows 8 ultrabooks get high marks for their inspired designs, but aren't quite flexible enough to truly be BYOD (Bring Your Own Device) solutions. Lenovo's own IdeaPad Yoga came close, but the sensation of feeling the keyboard underneath your fingers when transformed into tablet mode was slightly jarring. Dell's XPS 12 solved that problem with its clever rotating hinge design, but I wanted the ability to remove the tablet display entirely from both of those products."

ThinkPad 13 (2016–2017)
The ThinkPad 13 (Also known as the Thinkpad S2 in Mainland China) is a "budget" model with a 13-inch screen. Versions running Windows 10 and Google's ChromeOS were options. The most powerful configuration had a Skylake Core i7 processor and a 512GB SSD. Connectivity includes HDMI, USB 3.0, OneLink+, USB Type-C, etc. As of 2017, a second generation Ultrabook model has been released with up to a Kaby Lake Core i7 processor and a FHD touchscreen available in certain countries. This lineup was merged into the L-Series in 2018, with the L380 being the successor to the 13 Second Generation.

25th anniversary Retro ThinkPad (2017)

Lenovo released the 25th anniversary Retro ThinkPad 25 in October 2017. The model is based on the T470, the difference being it having the 7-Row "Classic" keyboard with the layout found on the −20 Series, and the logo received a splash of colour reminiscent of the IBM era. The last ThinkPad models with the 7-row keyboard were introduced in 2011.

A Series (2017–2018) 
In September 2017, Lenovo announced two ThinkPad models featuring AMD's PRO chipset technology – the A275 and A475. This sees the revival of the A Series nameplate not seen since the early 2000s when ThinkPads were under IBM's ownership, however it is likely the "A" moniker emphasised that it uses AMD technology rather than comparative product segment (workstation class) of the previous line.

While this isn't the first time Lenovo had offered an AMD derived ThinkPad, it is the first to be released as an alternative premium offering to the established T Series and X Series ThinkPads, which use Intel chipsets instead.

A275 and A475The A275 is a 12.5" ultraportable based on the Intel derived X270 model. Weighing in at 2.9 pounds (1.31 kg) this model features AMD Carrizo or Bristol Ridge APU's, AMD Radeon R7 graphics and AMD DASH (Desktop and mobile Architecture for System Hardware) for enterprise computing.

The A475 is a 14" mainstream portable computer based on the Intel derived T470 model. Weighing at 3.48 pounds (1.57 kg), like the A275 it features AMD Carrizo or Bristol Ridge APU's, AMD Radeon R7 graphics and AMD DASH (Desktop and mobile Architecture for System Hardware) for enterprise computing.

A285 and A485The A285 is a 12.5" laptop which is an upgraded version of the A275. The laptop also contains a Discrete Trusted Platform Module (dTPM) for data encryption and password protection, supporting TPM 2.0. Optional security features include a fingerprint scanner and smart card reader. The display's native resolution can be either  or  depending on the configuration.

The A485 is a 14" laptop which is an upgraded version of the A475. Weighing , this model utilizes AMD's Raven Ridge APU's with integrated Vega graphics. This model can use multiple models of Raven Ridge APU's, unlike the A285. The laptop also contains a Discrete Trusted Platform Module (dTPM) for data encryption and password protection, supporting TPM 2.0. Optional security features include a fingerprint scanner and smart card reader. The display's native resolution can be either  or  depending on the configuration.

See also
 ThinkBook
 IBM/Lenovo ThinkCentre and ThinkStation desktops
 List of IBM products
 HP EliteBook
 Dell Latitude and Precision
 Fujitsu Lifebook and Celsius

References

External links

 
 ThinkPad models on ThinkWiki
 Withdrawn models Specs Books
 

 
Think
Think
Consumer electronics brands
Computer-related introductions in 1992
Products introduced in 1992
2005 mergers and acquisitions
Divested IBM products
Business laptops